Aatu Hämäläinen (born 28 February 1987) is a Finnish professional ice hockey player playing for Iisalmen Peli-Karhut in Mestis, the second-tier league in Finland.

He previously played in the SM-liiga for KalPa, TPS and HPK. His younger brother Aleksi Hämäläinen also plays professionally and they are currently teammates at IPK.

References

External links

1987 births
Living people
Finnish ice hockey forwards
Hokki players
HPK players
Iisalmen Peli-Karhut players
KalPa players
KooKoo players
IF Sundsvall Hockey players
HC TPS players
People from Suonenjoki
Sportspeople from North Savo